Mike Burgoyne (born December 28, 1980 in Hamilton, Ontario) is a Canadian former professional ice hockey defenceman.

Career
Burgoyne spent his Junior Hockey career with the Hamilton Kiltys of the Ontario Junior Hockey League and the Stoney Creek Spirit of the Greater Ontario Junior Hockey League.

Burgoyne began his post-Junior career with the semi-professional Brantford Blast of the Ontario Hockey Association's Allan Cup Hockey for the 2002-03 season.  He then moved to the professional-level United Hockey League during the 2003-04 season, joining the Quad City Mallards.  He spent the 2004-05 season with the Mallards, the Rockford IceHogs, and the Motor City Mechanics.  After spending the entire 2005-06 season with the Mechanics, Burgoyne joined the Oklahoma City Blazers of the Central Hockey League for the 2006-07season, where he became a CHL All-Star.  During both of his seasons with the Blazers, he led the team in assists and points.  For the 2008-09 season, Burgoyne played in Northern Ireland for the Belfast Giants of the Elite Ice Hockey League.  He began the 2009-10 season by playing 6 games for the Victoria Salmon Kings of the ECHL before becoming an Unrestricted Free Agent on November 11, 2009.  On November 25, 2009, he signed with Missouri Mavericks of the Central Hockey League, playing with the team for the rest of the 2009-10 season.  For the 2010-11 season, Burgoyne played in The Netherlands for HYS The Hague of the North Sea Cup.  For the 2011-12 season, Burgoyne re-joined the Brantford Blast.  He played 19 games in his second stint with the Blast, earning himself the award as "Best Defenseman" in Allan Cup Hockey for the 2011-12 season, before signing with the Steaua Rangers of the Romanian Hockey League. He rejoined the Brantford Blast for the 2012-2013 and remained there until his retirement.

References

External links
 

1980 births
Living people
Belfast Giants players
Canadian expatriate ice hockey players in Northern Ireland
Canadian expatriate ice hockey players in the United States
Canadian ice hockey defencemen
Ice hockey people from Ontario
Missouri Mavericks players
Motor City Mechanics players
Oklahoma City Blazers (1992–2009) players
Quad City Mallards (UHL) players
Rockford IceHogs (UHL) players
Sportspeople from Hamilton, Ontario
Steaua Rangers players
Victoria Salmon Kings players
Canadian expatriate ice hockey players in the Netherlands
Canadian expatriate ice hockey players in Romania